YPCC may refer to:

Yupiit Piciryarait Cultural Center, Bethel, Alaska, United States
Cocos (Keeling) Islands Airport, Australia